Stephen Patrick McGlynn (born 1962) is a United States district judge of the United States District Court for the Southern District of Illinois.

Education 

McGlynn earned his Bachelor of Arts from the University of Dayton and his Juris Doctor from the Saint Louis University School of Law.

Career 

McGlynn was in private practice at McGlynn & McGlynn, Attorneys at Law. He has also served as a Special Assistant Attorney General of Illinois.

State judicial service 

He served as a justice of the Illinois Fifth District Appellate Court from 2005 to 2006. From 2013 to 2020, McGlynn served as a Circuit Judge for the Twentieth Judicial Circuit after being appointed by the Supreme Court of Illinois. McGlynn's service as a state court judge ended when he became a federal district judge.

In 2012, McGlynn ran unsuccessfully to again serve on the Illinois Appellate Court, losing to Democrat Judy Cates.

Federal judicial service 

On December 23, 2019, President Donald Trump announced his intent to nominate McGlynn to serve as a United States district judge of the United States District Court for the Southern District of Illinois. On February 4, 2020, his nomination was sent to the United States Senate. President Trump nominated him to the seat vacated by Judge Michael Joseph Reagan, who retired on March 31, 2019. A hearing on his nomination before the Senate Judiciary Committee was held on June 24, 2020. On July 30, 2020, his nomination was reported out of committee by a 13–9 vote. On September 16, 2020, the United States Senate invoked cloture on his nomination by a 55–42 vote. His nomination was confirmed later that day by a 55–41 vote. He received his judicial commission on September 18, 2020.

References

External links 
 
 

|-

1962 births
Living people
20th-century American lawyers
21st-century American lawyers
21st-century American judges
Illinois lawyers
Illinois Republicans
Illinois state court judges
Judges of the Illinois Appellate Court
Judges of the United States District Court for the Southern District of Illinois
People from East St. Louis, Illinois
Saint Louis University School of Law alumni
United States district court judges appointed by Donald Trump
University of Dayton alumni